Jaén tinto, also known as Jaén negro, is a red Spanish-wine grape variety.

References

Red wine grape varieties
Grape varieties of Spain